Kim Burfield is a former child actor who appeared in several films in the 1960s and 1970s.

Burfield appeared in two small roles television series and was cast in the film Bloomfield as Nimrod, a boy who runs from home to meet his footballing hero. He followed this up with major roles in Treasure Island as Jim Hawkins with Orson Welles as Long John Silver, and The Flying Sorcerer, which were his last acting roles.

Filmography
Bloomfield (1971)
Treasure Island (1972)
The Flying Sorcerer (1973)

Television work
Journey to the Unknown episode: "Miss Belle" (1968)
Sinister Street episode: Part 1 (1969)

References

External links

Living people
1961 births
British male child actors
British male film actors
British male television actors
Nationality missing